Marta or Martha García may refer to:
 Marta García (dancer) (1949–2017), Cuban ballet dancer
 Marta García (skater) (born 1993), Spanish figure skater
 Marta García (racing driver) (born 2000), Spanish racing driver
 Marta García Martín (born 2000), Spanish chess player
 Martha García (born 1965), Mexican rower
 Martha García Müller (born 1946), Mexican politician
 Martha Garcia (politician), American politician
 Marta Estevez Garcia (born 1997), Luxembourgish footballer
 Marta Linares García (born 1986), Spanish rhythmic gymnast